USA Team Handball is the governing body for handball in the United States. USA Team Handball is funded in part by the U.S. Olympic & Paralympic Committee.
Previously, the governing body was the United States Team Handball Federation.

USA Team Handball is led by an 9-person Board of Directors. The president is Michael J. Wall.

USA Team Handball organizes the participation of U.S. national teams in international competitions, such as the Summer Olympics and the Pan American Games. The United States men's national handball team and the United States women's national handball team have struggled in international competitions against nations where handball is more popular.

USA Team Handball organizes and sanctions the USA Team Handball Nationals and USA Team Handball College Nationals.

On February 3, 2023, CEO Ryan Johnson announced he was stepping down on February 28. President Michael Wall announced Martin Branick was elevated to Interim CEO starting March 1st.

List of presidents 
The first president was elected in 1959.

List of CEOs

See also
 Handball in the United States

References

External links
 USA Team Handball — Official site

Handball in the United States
Handball
United States 2
North America and Caribbean Handball Confederation members